Tarnma is a locality in the Mid North region of South Australia, between Marrabel and Eudunda, South Australia, crossed by the Curio Road, part of route B84. The area of Tarnma was known as Friedrichswalde until "names of enemy origin" were changed in 1918. The current boundaries were formalised in January 2001.

Tarnma has a cemetery and previously had two Lutheran churches, all on Frederick Road. The Immanuel Evangelical Lutheran Church was dedicated in 1872. The congregation split and the Redeemer congregation met in houses until its own building was dedicated in 1911. The Immanuel congregation was dissolved in 1957 and the Redeemer congregation dissolved in 1965. There was also a school until the 1940s.

References

Towns in South Australia